Boston Review is an American quarterly political and literary magazine. It publishes political, social, and historical analysis, literary and cultural criticism, book reviews, fiction, and poetry, both online and in print. Its signature form is a "forum", featuring a lead essay and several responses. Boston Review also publishes an imprint of books with MIT Press.

The editors in chief are Deborah Chasman and political philosopher Joshua Cohen; Pulitzer Prize-winning writer Junot Díaz is the fiction editor.

The magazine is published by Boston Critic, Inc., a nonprofit organization. It has received praise from notable intellectuals and writers including John Kenneth Galbraith, Henry Louis Gates Jr., John Rawls, Naomi Klein, Robin Kelley, Martha Nussbaum, and Jorie Graham.

History

Boston Review was founded as New Boston Review in 1975. A quarterly devoted to literature and the arts, the magazine was started by a group that included Juan Alonso, Richard Burgin, and Anita Silvey. In 1976, after the departure of some of the founding editors, the publication was co-edited by Juan Alonso and Gail Pool, and then by Gail Pool and Lorna Condon. In the late seventies, it switched from quarterly to bimonthly publication. In 1980, Arthur Rosenthal became publisher of the magazine, which was renamed Boston Review and edited by Nick Bromell. Succeeding editors were Mark Silk and then Margaret Ann Roth, who remained until 1991. During the eighties, the focus of the magazine broadened and during the nineties became more politically oriented, while maintaining a strong profile in both fiction and poetry.

Joshua Cohen replaced Roth in 1991, and has been editor since then. The full text of Boston Review has been available online since 1995. Since 1996, thirty books  have been published based on articles and forums that originally appeared in the Boston Review. Since 2006, MIT Press has been publishing a "Boston Review Books" series. 

Deborah Chasman joined the magazine as co-editor in 2001. Pulitzer-prize winner Junot Díaz is the current fiction editor; Timothy Donnelly, B. K. Fischer, and Stefania Heim are the poetry editors.

In 2010, Boston Review switched from black and white tabloid to an glossy, all-color format. The same year, it was the recipient of Utne Reader magazine's Utne Independent Press Award for Best Writing. 

The magazine switched print formats again in 2017, merging its bimonthly general interest magazine and book publications into quarterly, themed bookazines.

Features

New Democracy Forum
The New Democracy Forum is a special feature of the Boston Review. It offers an arena for fostering and exploring issues regarding politics and policy. A typical forum includes a lead article by an expert and contributions from other respondents. Past forums have covered topics such as making foreign aid work, a strategy to disengage from Iraq, and new economic stress in the middle class.

New Fiction Forum
The New Fiction Forum was created as "a space for wide-ranging dialogue about contemporary fiction, a dialogue founded on a simple premise: that despite the intense commercialism of current publishing, there are original, vital novels published every season and readers to whom such narratives are of the profoundest importance". Past forums include fiction and reviews by Jhumpa Lahiri and Emily Barton.

Fiction contests
The publication sponsors well-regarded annual contests in fiction; past winners include Michael Dorris, Tom Paine, and Jacob M. Appel.

"Discovery" prize 
The annual "Discovery"/Boston Review prize is given for a group of poems by a poet who has not yet published a book. Typically, the prize is awarded to four winners and four runners-up; winners read from their work at the 92nd Street Y's Unterberg Poetry Center. Begun in the 1960s as The Nation/"Discovery" prize, the Boston Review took over administration of the prize in 2007 when The Nation ended its partnership. Previous winners of the "Discovery" prize include John Ashbery, Alice James Books, Emily Hiestand, John Poch, and Martin Walls.

Notable contributors

 Bruce Ackerman, professor of law
 Sadik Al-Azm, philosopher
 John Ashbery, poet
 Mary Jo Bang, poet
 Dan Beachy-Quick, poet
 Saul Bellow, novelist
 Seyla Benhabib, philosopher and political scientist
 John Berger, artist, writer, and critic
 Jagdish Bhagwati, economist
 Joseph Biden, US President
 Hans Blix, diplomat, UN weapons inspector
 Harold Bloom, literary scholar
 Roberto Bolaño, Chilean novelist and poet
 Roger Boylan, novelist and critic
 Lucie Brock-Broido, poet
 Stephanie Burt, literary scholar
 Rafael Campo, poet, doctor and writer
 Aimé Césaire, poet and politician
 Philip N. Cohen, sociologist
 Noam Chomsky, linguist and political activist
 Juan Cole, historian
 Paul Collier, economist
 Colin Dayan, professor of American studies
 Rita Dove, Poet Laureate of the United States
 Khaled Abou El Fadl, professor of law
 Owen Fiss, professor of law
 Robert Frank, photographer and filmmaker
 John Kenneth Galbraith, economist
 Akbar Ganji, journalist
 Michael Gecan, political activist
 Vivian Gornick, essayist and critic
 Jorie Graham, poet
 Lani Guinier, professor of law
 Donald Hall, Poet Laureate of the United States
 Pamela S. Karlan, professor of law
 Elias Khoury, Lebanese novelist and journalist
 Paul Krugman, economist
 Jhumpa Lahiri, novelist
 Glenn Loury, economist
 Tim Maudlin, philosopher
 Heather McHugh, poet
 Honor Moore, poet
 Luis Moreno-Ocampo, International Criminal Court chief prosecutor
 Martha Nussbaum, philosopher
 Susan Okin, feminist political philosopher
 George Packer, journalist
 Grace Paley, writer and activist
 Gerald Peary, film critic
 Marjorie Perloff, literary scholar
 Rick Perlstein, historian and political commentator
 Robert Pinsky, Poet Laureate of the United States
 Eric Posner, professor of law
 Hilary Putnam, philosopher
 John Rawls, philosopher
 Kay Ryan, Poet Laureate of the United States
 John Roemer, economist
 Adrienne Rich, feminist poet
 Richard Rorty, philosopher
 Nir Rosen, journalist
 Saskia Sassen, sociologist
 Elaine Scarry, literary scholar
 Don Share, poet and literary critic
 Charles Simic, Poet Laureate of the United States
 Anne-Marie Slaughter, international affairs scholar
 Susan Sontag, essayist and social critic
 Eliot Spitzer, former Governor of New York
 Richard Stallman, software developer
 Marshall Steinbaum, economist
 Nicholas Stern, economist
 Alan A. Stone, professor of law, psychologist, and film critic
 Mark Strand, Poet Laureate of the United States
 Cass Sunstein, professor of law, administrator of the Office of Information and Regulatory Affairs
 Charles Taylor, philosopher
 Charles Tilly, sociologist
 John Updike, writer
 Hal Varian, economist
 Eliot Weinberger, essayist and translator
 Stephen Walt, international affairs scholar
 C. D. Wright, poet
 Howard Zinn, historian and social critic
 Jonathan Zittrain, professor of law

See also
List of literary magazines

References

External links
 
 Boston Review Books series

Bimonthly magazines published in the United States
Literary magazines published in the United States
Political magazines published in the United States
Quarterly magazines published in the United States
Magazines established in 1975
Magazines published in Boston